is a public aerodrome located  north of Fukui Station in the city of Sakai, Fukui Prefecture, Japan.

History
Work began on Fukui Airport in 1964, and the airport was opened in 1966, with All Nippon Airways (ANA) proving regularly scheduled services using a Fokker F-27 to Haneda Airport in Tokyo, with flights once or twice a day. The NAMC YS-11 replaced the F-27 on this route from April 1, 1972. However, the airport suffered from competition by nearby Komatsu Airport, whose longer runway could accommodate jet aircraft. Services between Fukui and Nagoya commenced from December 1, 1974 but all scheduled commercial flights were discontinued due to lack of passengers from March 1976. Local opposition remained strong, and improved bus and train connections to Komaki Airport resulted in less and less passengers to Fukui Airport. In 2001, the runway expansion project was shelved, and in June 2003 was cancelled in favour of pushing for completion of the Hokuriku Shinkansen high speed train. From October 2006, flight operations at Fukui Airport were transferred to the jurisdiction of the Chubu Centrair International Airport in Nagoya.

Current situation
Fukui Airport is currently used primarily for general aviation, and the aviation department of many universities conduct training operations here. Also, the airport is a center for glider sports, with a glider competition held annually. The Fukui Prefectural Police operates a Eurocopter EC135 and the Fukui Prefectural Fire Department operates a MBB/Kawasaki BK 117 from Fukui Airport.

References

Airports in Japan
Transport in Fukui Prefecture
Buildings and structures in Fukui Prefecture
1966 establishments in Japan
Airports established in 1966
Sakai, Fukui